The Atatürk Museum in Mersin is a two-storey house in Mersin, which hosted the founder of modern Turkey, Mustafa Kemal Atatürk and his wife in 1925.

History 
The house was originally built in 1897 by H. Christman, the German consul to Mersin when he married a Mersin citizen (of the Mavromati family). It was named Krizman house (Krizman konağı). In 1925, the house was assigned for Atatürk, when he visited Mersin on 20 January with his wife, Latife. They stayed eleven days. 

In later years, the building was used by the Fedon Tahinci family and was called Tahinci house. In 1980, it was bought by the government. After restoration, it was transformed to a museum specialized on Atatürk and the Turkish War of Independence. The museum was opened on 12 October 1992.

Displayed items 
In the ground floor, there is a photo and document gallery with a small conference room. There are some personal belongings of Atatürk, brought from Ankara. In the upper floor there are seven rooms: two are bedrooms, one room is a study, and the rest are sitting rooms, all decorated with the original furniture.

See also
Mersin Museum
Mersin Naval Museum
Atatürk Museums in Turkey

References

External links 
Mersin Metropolitan municipality page 

Mersin
Culture in Mersin
Historic house museums in Turkey
Museums established in 1992
Tourist attractions in Mersin
1992 establishments in Turkey
Museums in Mersin
Buildings and structures in Mersin